1988–89 was the seventy-sixth occasion on which the Lancashire Cup completion was held. Wigan won the trophy, beating Salford 22-17. The match was played at Knowsley Road, St Helens, with an attendance of 19,154 and receipts of £71,879.00

This was Wigan’s fifth appearance, and fourth consecutive victory in a run of four victories and five appearances in five successive years. The attendance was the fifth in five years to reach almost 20,000, and the receipts set a new record, exceeding the previous record by approximately £4,500.

Background 

This season the total number of entrants remained at the 16 level.
With this full sixteen members there was no need for “blank” or “dummy” fixtures or any byes.

Competition and results

Round 1 
Involved  8 matches (with no byes) and 16 clubs

Round 2 - Quarter-finals 
Involved 4 matches and 8 clubs

Round 3 – Semi-finals  
Involved 2 matches and 4 clubs

Final

Teams and scorers 

Scoring - Try = four points - Goal = two points - Drop goal = one point

The road to success

Notes and comments 
1 * The first Lancashire Cup match to be played by the newly renamed club Chorley Borough
2 * The first Lancashire Cup match to be played at Carlisle's new stadium 
3 * Knowsley Road was the home ground of St. Helens from 1890 to 2010. The final capacity was in the region of 18,000, although the actual record attendance was 35,695, set on 26 December 1949, for a league game between St Helens and Wigan

See also 
1988–89 Rugby Football League season
Rugby league county cups

References

External links
Saints Heritage Society
1896–97 Northern Rugby Football Union season at wigan.rlfans.com 
Hull&Proud Fixtures & Results 1896/1897
Widnes Vikings - One team, one passion Season In Review - 1896-97
The Northern Union at warringtonwolves.org

1988 in English rugby league
RFL Lancashire Cup